Gotta Get It is a collaboration album by rappers, Juvenile and JT the Bigga Figga. The album was released on October 2, 2002 from Get Low Recordz/UTP Records and was produced by Juvenile and JT the Bigga Figga.

Track listing
"Holla At Ya Thugz"(Juvenile & Ball Or Fall Family) - 2:48
"Got G'z On It" (Yukmouth, Killa Tay & Mac Mall) - 4:24
"I Know" (Ant Dog, Tac & London) - 5:09
"Reptillian" (Priceless {from K.C.}) - 4:44
"Gotta Get It" (Juvenile, JT the Bigga Figga, Billy Cook & Young Buck) - 3:39
"Gotta Love It" (Cozmo & PDS {of the Recruits}) - 4:12
"Open Arms" (London) - 4:49
"Cold World" (PDS {of the Recruits}) - 5:19
"Risky Business" (Killa Tay & Marvaless) - 4:24
"Ride Or Die" (Outlawz & Murder One) - 3:01
"C.E.O. Stacks" (Juvenile, Young Buck, Skip & JT the Bigga Figga) - 4:17
"Step To The Side" (Tha Gamblaz & Sean T.) - 3:44
"Dump Dump" (Tac & Killa Tay) - 3:59
"Thug Life" (Messy Marv) - 4:29

References

Juvenile (rapper) albums
JT the Bigga Figga albums
2002 albums